Jane Thomas may refer to:

 Jane Thomas (American Revolution), passed intelligence that thwarted an ambush in the American Revolution
 Jane Thomas (actress) (1899–1976), American film actress
 Jane Thomas (tennis) (born 1966), American tennis player
 Jane Resh Thomas, American children's writer